Clementsville may refer to:

 Clementsville, Idaho
 Clementsville, Kentucky